The s Tennis Masters Challenger was a tennis tournament held in Graz, Austria from 1991 to 2008. The event was part of the ATP Challenger Series and was played on outdoor clay courts.

Past finals

Singles

Doubles

External links 
 
ITF Search

ATP Challenger Tour
Clay court tennis tournaments
Tennis tournaments in Austria